Protein NDRG4 is a protein that in humans is encoded by the NDRG4 gene.

This gene is a member of the N-myc downregulated gene family which belongs to the alpha/beta hydrolase superfamily. The protein encoded by this gene is a cytoplasmic protein that may be involved in the regulation of mitogenic signalling in vascular smooth muscles cells. Several alternatively spliced transcript variants of this gene have been described, but the full-length nature of some of these variants has not been determined.

References

Further reading

Human proteins